Telphusa atomatma is a moth of the family Gelechiidae. It is found in India (Punjab).

References

Moths described in 1932
Telphusa
Taxa named by Edward Meyrick